Rod Espinosa is a Filipino comics creator, writer, and illustrator. In addition to his lengthy work Neotopia, for Antarctic Press, Espinosa has done extensive work adapting and illustrating literary classics into comics form, as well as creating comic book stories of important events from American history.

Biography
Espinosa was born in the Philippines. He graduated from the Don Bosco technical college with a certificate in architectural drafting and got a degree in advertising art from Santo Tomas University in Manila. He worked for various companies in the fields of advertising, software entertainment and film before finally settling into a life of a comic book author.

Espinosa's work on The Courageous Princess at Antarctic Press earned him a nomination for Promising New Talent and Best Artist for the 2000 Ignatz Awards and a 2002 Eisner Award nomination for Best Title for Younger Readers.

As both writer and artist, he authored the Neotopia series (4 volumes, 140 pages each), which was published in graphic novel form. In 2006, Novotopia, the German edition of Neotopia, got a nomination for the Max & Moritz Prize in the category 'Bester Comic für Kinder' (best comic book for younger audience).

His past work include the Battle Girlz series, a manga novel adaptation of Alice in Wonderland, The Alamo, Dinowars and Metadocs. He has also written and conceptualized popular Antarctic Press titles such as I Hunt Monsters and Herc and Thor.

His work is also featured in a series of American history comic books dealing with the subjects of George Washington, Benjamin Franklin, Lewis and Clark, The Boston Tea Party, The Alamo, Jackie Robinson, the Underground Railroad, Abraham Lincoln, Patrick Henry,  Cesar Chavez, The American Revolution, the Transcontinental Railroad, and Clara Barton.

Espinosa's latest endeavor is creating, developing, drawing, and self-publishing his own game board, titled Adventure Kingdom.

The Courageous Princess "The Unremembered Lands" and The Courageous Princess "The Dragon Queen", were released in the summer and winter of 2015 respectively.

Humanitarian work 
In 2008, Espinosa won an international contest sponsored by the United Nations and the World Health Organization entitled Stop Tuberculosis. The Stop TB comic book educating people about how to avoid Tuberculosis featured soccer star Luís Figo as the spokesman.

In 2009, Espinosa joined 60 other Filipino artists from all over the world and contributed to the tribute book Renaissance: Ang Muling Pagsilang, the sales of which were donated to the victims of typhoon Ondoy.

In 2010, Espinosa returned to draw a second book for the United Nations, featuring a "dream team" of soccer players led by Luís Figo. Score the Goals features the Millennium Development Goals as outlined by the U.N., WHO, and the Food and Agriculture Organization.

Neotopia

Neotopia is a four-part comic book miniseries (consisting of 20 issues) written and drawn by Espinosa, and published by Antarctic Press. It is set 800 years after the rise of a movement which tried to destroy the capitalist system and build a new, better world.

Neotopia features the supposed Grand Duchess of Mathenia, Nalyn, environmentally friendly inventor Philios, the faerie Nimn, the telepathic and telekinetic dolphin Ki-Ek, elven bodyguard Marro, robot warrior Sergeant Tinbolt, the Chiropterian Monti, and Tridactylian professor Felder.

In the comic series, the nation of Neotopia is gone, but other nations have sprung up. The comics follow a conflict between Mathenia, which follows the precepts of the Neotopians, and Krossos, which is a dystopian industrial dictatorship, ruled by the inhuman Lord Emperors. The change in humanity resulted in the emergence or re-emergence of various nonhuman civilizations, including wood-elves, the bat-like chiropterans, Dalphinii dolphins, and the alien Tridactylians.

The story begins with Princess Nalydania, a woman who orders her serving girl, Nalyn, to impersonate her at all public functions, including lessons. She leaves to attend an important ball in another country. The land of Krossos declares war on Mathenia, and attempts to kidnap the look-alike Nalyn whom they mistake for the actual Princess Nalydania. Nalyn escapes with the help of friends, and searches for allies in the war.

In her travels, Nalyn and her friends encounter the humanoid hyena corsairs, the utopian island of Eriden, and a queendom of amazons on the island of Eriland.  In the final issue, Nalyn and her allies attack Krossos' fortress capital. Within it, they find substantial amounts of gold, patents to all known devices, and deeds to the entire world. They find the Lord Emperors of Krossos — who it is revealed are men who forsook their humanity in order to gain 'perfect' bodies through technology. They desperately offer Nalyn a share of their wealth; 40% of the world, as well as technological immortality, only to discover that she set fire to their library of patents and deeds on the way in. She offers them a choice to surrender and let the old world die, or refuse and die themselves. They refuse, and she leaves, ordering her forces to destroy the palace.

The story of Neotopia is decidedly socialist. Its portrayal of the final days of the old world, and most notably of its greatest empire, Elyssion, is harsh. In a series of monologues written from the viewpoint of the Mathenians, Espinosa touches on such issues as capitalist oligarchy, pollution, the lack of community in large cities, slave labour, gender bias, and cruelty to animals and children.

Bibliography 
 The Courageous Princess
 Neotopia (Antarctic Press)
 Battle Girlz
  The Alamo
 Dinowars
 Metadocs
 I Hunt Monsters (Antarctic Press)
 Herc and Thor (Antarctic Press)
 Graphic Biographies series (ABDO, A Family of Educational Publisher): 
 George Washington
 Benjamin Franklin
 Patrick Henry
 Sacagewea
 Jackie Robinson
 Graphic History series (ABDO, A Family of Educational Publisher): 
 The Boston Tea Party
 The American Revolution
 Lewis and Clark
 The Underground Railroad
 The Transcontinental Railroad
 Graphic Adventures: the Human Body series (ABDO, A Family of Educational Publisher): 
 The Brain
 The Lungs
 The Eye
 The Liver
 The Kidneys
 The Heart
 U.S. Presidents Biographies series (ABDO, A Family of Educational Publisher): 
 John Adams
 Thomas Jefferson
 Ulysses S. Grant
 Barack Obama
 Historical Animals series (ABDO) 
 Dolly the Cloned Sheep 
 Bud the Traveling Dog
 comic book adaptations of literacy classics (ABDO)
 Around the World in Eighty Days
 Moby-Dick
 Phantom of the Opera
 Journey to the Center of the Earth
 Dracula (Adapted by Dan Conner)
 William Shakespeare's Romeo and Juliet, Midsummer Night’s Dream (Adapted by Dan Conner), As You Like It, Comedy of Errors, Much Ado About Nothing, and Winter's Tale
 Graphic Classics series (Eureka Productions):
 William Shakespeare's Cymbeline 
 Edgar Allan Poe's "The Raven" and "The Cask of Amontillado"
 The Wendigo
 Jack Finney's The Body Snatchers
 Super Roommates
 Evil Diva
 Courageous Princess — writer and artist
 Alice in Wonderland Manga (Dark Horse Comics) — adaptation and art 
 A Christmas Carol (Dark Horse Comics) — adaptation and art
Steampunk Fairy Tale series
 Steampunk Snow White (Antarctic Press Comics) — adaptation and art
 Steampunk Snow Queen (Antarctic Press Comics) — adaptation and art
 Steampunk Cinderella (Antarctic Press Comics) — adaptation and art
 Steampunk Red Riding Hood (Antarctic Press Comics) — adaptation and art
 Steampunk Little Match Girl (Antarctic Press Comics) — adaptation and art
 Steampunk Goldilocks (Antarctic Press Comics) — adaptation and art
Immortal Wings series
Issue 1, January 2016 (Antarctic Press Comics) -art
Issue 2, February 2016 (Antarctic Press Comics) - art
Issue 3, March 2016, (Antarctic Press Comics) - art 
Issue 4, April 2016, ( Antarctic Press Comics) - art
Adventure Finders 
 Issue 1, September 2017 (Antarctic Press Comics) -story and art
 Issue 2, October 2017 (Antarctic Press Comics) -story and art

References 

 Asian Journal (September 8, 2008)

Notes

External links

Prince of Heroes

Year of birth missing (living people)
Living people
Filipino comics writers
University of Santo Tomas alumni